Venusberg is the second novel by the English writer Anthony Powell. Published in 1932, it is set in an unidentified Baltic country which draws clearly on Powell's experiences in Finland and Estonia.  Some see the novel as part of the Ruritanian tradition (cf. The Prisoner of Zenda), perhaps a modernist pastiche of the form.
 
The novel continues Powell's humorously critical examination of society, its various forms and fashions, this time against a background largely removed from London and English life. Romantic entanglements and the dissatisfactions of love remain a major concern and the novel maintains Powell's characteristic mingling of comedy and embarrassment.  Of Powell's novels, Venusberg makes the greatest use of short chapters and quick changes of scene in the plot.

As might be supposed from the title, the novel treats aspects of the Tannhäuser legend.  The Baedeker quotation Powell uses as an epigraph is a key to understanding the role the Tannhäuser legend plays. Baedeker combines the myth with reality–stressing the good view from the top of the mountain–signalling to the reader the need to rise above the pettiness in which most of the novel's characters are entrammeled in order to see clearly.  Venusberg is thus an anti-Tannhäuser: an anticlimactic, anti-Wagnerian, anti-romantic tone pervades a story in which everyone is somehow let down.

Plot summary

Dissatisfied with life and love in London, Lushington, a journalist, secures a posting in the Baltic and sets sail.  Before he even reaches the new country, on board ship he has met and become thoroughly entangled with many of the characters who will affect his immediate future, including Ortrud Mavrin, the Russian counts, Scherbatcheff and Bobel, and Baroness Puckler.

Once in the Baltic, Lushington finds himself sharing accommodations with the other party involved in the love triangle that first provoked him into leaving England, one Da Costa. Lushington is soon thoroughly involved in personal and political intrigues, meeting various diplomats, representatives of the State Police, the intrusive valet, Pope (whose name ironically recalls the role played by the Pope in the Tannhäuser legend), the American diplomat Curtis Cortney–even Frau Mavrin's little child who "looks like his father, curiously enough."

Melancholy, shyness and embarrassment dominate the novel, suffusing even those scenes involving sudden violence with a sense of bemused, slightly detached sadness.  Lushington's eventual return to England is set against a continued background of misunderstanding and social ineptitude which make clear that Powell has not simply been satirizing how things happen "on the Continent."

External links
 Anthony Powell Society

References

1932 British novels
Novels by Anthony Powell
Gerald Duckworth and Company books